NUP is an abbreviation for:
 National Umma Party Sudan. a political party in Sudan
 National Union Party (disambiguation), a number political parties in various states
 National Unity Party (Philippines)
 National Unity Platform, main opposition party in Uganda
 Neapolis University, Pafos, a university in Cyprus
 Necrotizing ulcerative periodontitis, a subclassification of Necrotizing periodontal diseases
 New Union Party, a political party in the United States
 New Unity Partnership, a trade union in the United States
 Northwestern University Press
 Nottingham University Press
 Nuclear Pore
 Número único previsional ("unique social security number"), the identification number for social security in El Salvador